La Roche Vendée Football is a French association football team based in La Roche-sur-Yon, Vendée, France.

History
The club was founded in 1947 and play at the Stade Henri Desgranges in the town. In the 2017–18 season they played in the Championnat National 3.

Notable coaches 

 Thierry Bonalair
 Lionel Duarte
 Christian Dupont
 Jocelyn Gourvennec
 Christian Letard
 Joachim Marx
 Sébastien Migné
 Vincent Rautureau

Notes

External links
 La Roche VF official website 

1947 establishments in France
Association football clubs established in 1947
Football clubs in Pays de la Loire
Sport in Vendée